Bipana Thapa is a Nepali Actress. Bipana had been active in Nepali film industry until she got married in 2008 to Ashutosh Bhardwoj.

Bipana Thapa was born in Kathmandu. She was one of the prominent actress of Nepal in 90's. In addition to acting Bipana was also into fashion designing business. She used to design her own costumes for her roles in her movies.  Her design business Bipanaz Boutique was located at Bhatbhateni, Kathmandu.

Filmography

References

External links

Living people
21st-century Nepalese actresses
Nepalese female models
1977 births
20th-century Nepalese actresses
Actors from Kathmandu
Nepalese film actresses
Actresses in Nepali cinema